Malcolm Waldron born 6 September 1956 is an English former footballer who played for various clubs, including Southampton and Portsmouth. He played as a centre back during the late 1970s and early 1980s.

Playing career

Southampton
Born in Emsworth, Hampshire, Waldron was initially spotted playing for Havant and Hampshire school teams and was snapped up by Southampton, joining them as an apprentice in July 1973 before signing professional papers on reaching 18 in September 1974.

He made his debut on 12 April 1975 in a 0–0 draw away to Nottingham Forest. He made 3 appearances that season and 2 the following before establishing himself as a regular member of the Saints' defence in 1976–77. Although he could play anywhere in the back four, his best position was as sweeper, with his strength lying mainly in heading and tackling.

Waldron is described in Holley & Chalk's The Alphabet of the Saints as being "extememly agile and lithe for a big man, he also packed a thunderbolt of a shot and scored some memorable gals for the club".

During Southampton's promotion season 1977–78, he played "second fiddle" to Chris Nicholl and Mike Pickering and was often replaced by Manny Andruszewski in the centre of defence. He really came to the fore in Saints' first season back in Division 1, when he was an ever-present. He also played in all of Southampton's matches as they reached the final of the League Cup in 1979, only to lose 3–2 in the final. He was voted Saints' "Player of the Season" for 1978–79 and in the following season he was called up for the England B team against New Zealand.

The following season, he lost his place to David Watson as Lawrie McMenemy once again started to re-build the Southampton team. Injury forced him to miss most of the 1980–81 season in which Saints finished in sixth place in Division 1, thus qualifying for European football.

He spent the summer of 1981 playing in the United States for Washington Diplomats before returning to The Dell. His return was disappointing and a succession of irritating injuries and a loss of form led to a transfer to Burnley for £90,000 in September 1983.

Waldron made a total of 218 appearances for Southampton over 8 years, scoring 11 goals.

Burnley and Portsmouth
His brief spell at Turf Moor was not a happy time and after falling out with John Bond he moved to his home-town club, Portsmouth the following May.

At Fratton Park he continued to suffer from injuries and was unable to return to his previous high standard. He eventually retired from professional football in December 1986.

After retirement

He turned out for Road-Sea Southampton F.C. in their final 1986–87 season. He subsequently worked for Abbey Life and latterly as health care adviser for BUPA in Poole.

References

1956 births
Living people
People from Emsworth
Southampton F.C. players
Burnley F.C. players
Portsmouth F.C. players
England B international footballers
Association football central defenders
English footballers